C. Wesley Cowan (born September 4, 1951 in Louisville, Kentucky) is an American anthropologist, auctioneer, and appraiser of antiques.  He is an owner of Cowan's Auctions, Inc. in Cincinnati, Ohio.

Education and career 
Cowan is a licensed auctioneer in Ohio and received a B.A. and M.A. in Anthropology from the University of Kentucky,
and a Ph.D. in Anthropology from the University of Michigan.

After receiving his Ph.D., he taught at the Anthropology Department of Ohio State University.

In 1984, Cowan moved to Cincinnati, Ohio to be the Curator of Archaeology at the Cincinnati Museum of Natural History & Science. He has published in the fields of American archaeology and paleoethnobotany.

In 1995, he left academia and founded his antiques business, Cowan's Auctions, Inc. in Cincinnati, Ohio.

Cowan has been a regular in the PBS series Antiques Roadshow and History Detectives.

Selected publications

Books 

 Cowan, C. Wesley; Watson, Patty Jo, (editors), The Origins of Agriculture in International Perspective, Tuscaloosa, Alabama : The University of Alabama Press, January 28, 2006 (originally published in 1992 by The Smithsonian Institution Press, Washington D.C. )
 Brose, David S.; Cowan, C. Wesley; Mainfort, Robert C., (editors), Societies in Eclipse: Eastern North America at the Dawn of European Colonization, Washington, S.C. : Smithsonian Institution Press, 2001.
 Brose, David S.; Cowan, C. Wesley; Mainfort, Robert C., (editors), Societies in Eclipse: Archaeology of the Eastern Woodlands Indians, A.D. 1400-1700, Tuscaloosa, Alabama : The University of Alabama Press, 2010
 Cowan, C. Wesley, First farmers of the middle Ohio Valley : Fort Ancient societies, A.D. 1000-1670, Cincinnati, Ohio : Cincinnati Museum of Natural History, 1987

References

External links 

American antiques experts
American television personalities
Male television personalities
Living people
1951 births
University of Michigan alumni
American auctioneers
Television personalities from Louisville, Kentucky
University of Kentucky alumni